James Denis Riley (born 26 January 1948) is a former New Zealand cricketer who was born in Christchurch. Active from 1968 to 1971, he made 40 first-class appearances for Auckland, Wellington and Canterbury as a left-hand batsman. In all he scored 1993 runs, at an average of 32.14, with a high score of 130.

See also
 List of Auckland representative cricketers

References

1948 births
New Zealand cricketers
Auckland cricketers
Canterbury cricketers
Wellington cricketers
Living people
Cricketers from Christchurch